Athis rutila is a moth in the Castniidae family. It is found in Brazil (upper Amazonas), Venezuela, French Guiana and Peru.

The length of the forewings is about 58 mm. The forewings are brownish orange, but slightly darker at the base. There is a dark, rounded spot on the apex of the discal cell and toward the costal margin. Two dark spots are found subapically. The hindwings are brownish orange, but yellowish along the costal and the anal margins. There is a dark extradiscal spot band. Between this and the lateral margin, there are orange spots. This lateral margin is dark and ends with a fringe of orange scales.

The larvae feed on epiphytic Bromelia species.

Subspecies
Athis rutila rutila (Upper Amazonas)
Athis rutila rutiloides (Houlbert, 1918) (Peru)

References

Moths described in 1874
Castniidae